Badikhel is a village and former Village Development Committee that is now part of Godawari Municipality in Province No. 3 of central Nepal. At the time of the 1991 Nepal census it had a population of 2,711 in 461 individual households. Bamboo is one of the major natural product of this village.

A local dialect of the Newar language is spoken here. Its native speakers call it Pahari (Pāhāri) or Nagarkote, while to the Newar speakers of neighbouring Patan it is known as Pahibhāe.

References

External links
UN map of the municipalities of Lalitpur District

Populated places in Lalitpur District, Nepal